Mersa Matruh, also transliterated as Marsa Matruh, is a port in Egypt and the capital of Matrouh Governorate. The city is also accessible from the south via another highway running through the Western Desert towards Siwa Oasis and Bahariya Oasis.

In ancient Egypt and during the reign of Alexander the Great, the city was known as Amunia. In the Ptolemaic Kingdom and later during the Byzantine Empire, it was known as Paraitónion. During the Roman Empire, it was called Paraetonium in Latin, which became  after the mid-7th century Muslim conquest of Egypt. As a British military base during World War II, several battles were fought around its environs as the Italo-German Panzer Army Africa attempted to capture the port. It fell to the Axis during the Battle of Mersa Matruh, but was recaptured following the Second Battle of El Alamein.

Mersa Matruh is served by Mersa Matruh International Airport. The city features soft white sand beaches and calms transparent waters; the bay is protected from the high seas by a series of rocks forming a natural breakwater, with a small opening to allow access for light vessels.

History 
Mersa Matruh started as a small fishing town during Ancient Egyptian times and the reign of Alexander The Great and was named Amunia. There are ruins of a temple for Ramesses II (1200 BC). The city became known as Paraitonion in the Ptolemaic era. Ovid wrote that its goddess is Isis. After Egypt came under Roman rule, the town became an important harbor for trade and shipping goods and crops to Rome.

After the Arabic conquest, the city's name changed to Al-Baretun. The city also bore other names from at least the beginning of the 20th century – Berek Marsa, Port Mhaddra (Mithr), and Port Bardiah.

During World War II, the British Army's Baggush Box was located to the east. Starting with the completion of an extension from the previous railhead at Fuka in February 1936, Mersa Matruh was the terminus for a single-track railway, which passed through El Alamein. Mersa Matruh served as a vital British military base during World War II and was a major objective of Erwin Rommel's Afrika Korps, which captured it during the Battle of Mersa Matruh.

Geography

Climate 
Mersa Matruh has a dry-summer hot desert climate (BWhs) according to Köppen climate classification, but winds blowing from the Mediterranean Sea greatly moderate the temperature, making its summers moderately hot and humid while its winters are mild and moderately wet. Summers are sunny and dry, while in the colder months, there is some rain and cloud cover. Sleet and hail are common in Winter.

Mersa Matruh and Port Said have the coolest summer days off all Egyptian cities and resorts, although not significantly cooler than other northern coastal places. Additionally Rafah, Alexandria, Abu Qir, Rosetta, Baltim, Kafr el-Dawwar and Mersa Matruh are the wettest in Egypt.

Another source shows more precipitation and stabler average temperatures.

Main sights 
 Ruins of the Temple of the King, Pharaoh Ramesses II (1200 BC)
 Drowned city of Caesar.
 Drowned Palace of Cleopatra.
 Egyptian Fleet Anchorage which was built by the Ptolemies. The remains of the naval installations still stand west of the port.
 Coptic Chapel: built in the early Coptic age, it contains several caves bearing inscriptions.
 Rommel's Hideout: A cave, hewn in the rock, where Rommel drew up plans for his military operations. It has now been turned into a military museum.
 The British Cemetery: Thousands of rock-hewn tombstones stand in straight rows amidst a fenced garden.
 The German Cemetery: It is a fortress-like memorial that was built on a height overlooking the sea.
 The Italian Cemetery: It is a high tower fort standing on a high hill. The walls of the building are covered with marble.

Main beaches 
 Ageebah Beach: About 28 km west of Mersa Matruh downtown, it is distinguished by its numerous natural cave
 Al-Obayed Beach: About 20 km west of Mersa Matruh downtown
 Rommel Bay.

Photo gallery

See also

 List of cities and towns in Egypt
 Northern coast of Egypt

References

External links
Marsa Matrouh images

Sources

 
Governorate capitals in Egypt
Populated places in Matrouh Governorate
Populated coastal places in Egypt
Tourism in Egypt
Mediterranean port cities and towns in Egypt